Car hydraulics are equipment installed in an automobile that allows for a dynamic adjustment in height of the vehicle. These suspension modifications are often placed in a lowrider, i.e., a vehicle modified to lower its ground clearance below that of its original design. With these modifications, the body of the car can be raised by remote control. The amount and kind of hydraulic pumps being used and the different specifications of the subject vehicle will affect the impact of such systems on the height and orientation of the vehicle.  With sufficient pumps, an automobile can jump and hop upwards of six feet off the ground. Enthusiasts hold car jumping contests nationwide, which are judged on how high an automobile is able to bounce.

Origin 
Lowrider automobiles originated in Mexican American communities in Southern California. Car hydraulics were originally very expensive to have installed, and were only used to be shown at car shows.  However, after WWII, more Mexican Americans were able to afford older, less expensive, automobiles. In the early 1960s, these automobiles, many times classics from the 1950s, began to be modified and customized to riding low to the ground. This however, was not favored by many police in Southern California and owners of these cars were ticketed. This is the reason behind why car hydraulics were installed. This enabled these car drivers to adjust these cars to the original height when put in a compromising position. It began to spread to African American communities, as well as White American communities, throughout Southern California and many other western states. Today, lowriders can be found anywhere, worldwide, however the greater percentage is in the Western States in the United States.

International 
In 1979, Japan received a shipment of Low rider magazines, which showed on the cover a lowered Chevy in front of Mount Fuji. This magazine, Orlie's Lowriding Magazine, was a profitable magazine that advertised lowriders and hydraulic kits for their consumers.  Along with these magazines came mail-order forms to purchase automotive hydraulics kits. By the 1980s, these kits along with cars, made Japan Orlie's top purchaser.

Interior 
The original pumps, valves and cylinders used for the modifications to these cars were originally used for operations performed in aircraft. Using these materials required a great deal of engineering ability in order to get these cars back in working condition after being stripped. For many automobile owners, it was too expensive to have an auto shop install the hydraulics in their car for them. In the early 1960s, owners were left to do the mechanics for their own cars because the kits were not sold in stores until the later 1960s. These hydraulic kits were known as "trays" to many consumers. Many times, since these batteries, pumps and valves were made for such large aircraft originally, extra batteries were needed to assist in the hydraulics. This would run the batteries down more often than the original usage for these batteries, so it was necessary for the owners of these automobiles to charge the automobile's batteries more frequently. After using aircraft materials, trucks' liftgate materials were found to be more manageable on the car as well as easing the maintenance of the car.

These cylinders, two or more, are connected to one pipe that is filled with oil, the basic fluid used for a hydraulic system. The cylinders are used to establish compression pressure of the oil, fluid being supplied by the pump, to push the automobile up.  The motion of car is defined by the number of cylinder pumps installed in the vehicle. The number and placement of the pumps determines the range of motion the automobile has. A hydraulic dump valve called a "dump" is used to control the downward movement of  the car.

Advertisement 
Car Hydraulics are many times shown and advertised in the media. In the 1970s, many movies shot in east Hollywood became known for their lowrider automobiles with fancy hydraulics. Movies such as Up in Smoke and Chong's Classic were some of the few films featuring lowriders. Even in more recent films and media, these automobiles are being displayed. Demonstrated in 1998's Wrongfully Accused, Leslie Nielsen's character, Ryan Harrison, steals a car that has installed hydraulics. The movie displays the bounce given by certain hydraulic systems that are equipped in specific cars. In 2004, Snoop Dogg's music video, "Drop It Like It's Hot", featuring Pharrell, a 2004 Rolls-Royce Phantom is showing its installation hydraulics by tilting on the two left wheels, behind Snoop Dogg rapping.

See also 
Automobile   
Custom car
Hydraulics
Lowrider
Los Angeles

References

External links 
Lowrider Magazine
Lowrider Magazine- Japan Super Show

Auto parts
Control devices